Jens Lehmann is a computer scientist, most noted for his work on knowledge graphs and Artificial Intelligence. He is a principal scientist at Amazon (company), honorary professor at TU Dresden and a fellow of European Laboratory for Learning and Intelligent Systems. Formerly, he was a full professor at the University of Bonn, Germany and lead scientist for Conversational AI and Knowledge Graphs at Fraunhofer IAIS.

Research 
In 2007, he co-founded the DBpedia knowledge graph project.
He also works on Symbolic Artificial Intelligence, in particular for learning concepts in Description Logics (DLs) as well as OWL class expressions.

Within the field of Question Answering, he developed approaches to transform natural language questions into queries against a knowledge graph.
Furthermore, he investigates representation learning approaches for knowledge graphs and their application in downstream machine learning tasks.

Within the scope of the Center for Explainable and Efficient AI Technologies CEE AI, a collaboration between the Fraunhofer Society and Technische Universität Dresden, Jens Lehmann was coordinating the Fraunhofer IAIS Dresden lab with a main focus on Conversational Artificial Intelligence. 
Recent projects include a demonstrator presented at Hannover fair 2019 in a collaboration between the Fraunhofer Cluster of Excellence Cognitive Internet Technologies, Volkswagen and the Fraunhofer Institute for Integrated Circuits IIS, and the SPEAKER project towards an AI platform for business-to-business speech assistants.

Education and Career 
Jens Lehmann graduated with a master's degree in Computer Science from the Technical University of Dresden and the University of Bristol in 2006. He then obtained a doctoral degree (Dr. rer. nat) with grade summa cum laude at the Leipzig University in 2010 and was a research visitor at the University of Oxford. In 2013, he became a leader of the Agile Knowledge Engineering and Semantic Web research group (AKSW) at the Leipzig University. Subsequently, he was appointed as professor at University of Bonn and Fraunhofer IAIS in 2015. Since 2016, he is leading the Smart Data Analytics Research Group involving researchers from the University of Bonn, Fraunhofer IAIS, the Institute of Applied Informatics co-affiliation with the University of Leipzig and TU Dresden. In 2019, he started the Fraunhofer IAIS Dresden lab.
In 2022, he moved to Amazon as principal scientist and was awarded honorary professor at TU Dresden.

Awards 
The impact of his research has been awarded in different ways by the community. He received the 10 Year SWSA Award for his work on DBpedia together with other co-founders that was published at the International Semantic Web Conference, the Semantic Web Journal outstanding paper Award, ESWC 7-Year Most Influential Paper Award, Outstanding Paper Award Winner at the Literati Network Awards for Excellence 2013, the ISWC 2011 Best Research Paper Award, and the Journal of Web Semantics Most Cited Paper Award 2006–2010. He also received a 10-year award  for his work on LinkedGeoData.
For his early work on learning concepts in description logics, he received the Best Student Paper Award  at the International Conference on Inductive Logic Programming (ILP) 2007.

References

External links 
 Smart Data Analytics research group
 CEE.AI
 Speaker Project
 

Academic staff of the University of Bonn
1982 births
Living people
German computer scientists
Semantic Web people
Artificial intelligence researchers
Machine learning researchers